Harden's is a UK restaurant guide, publishing print, online and mobile reviews and ratings for both London and UK restaurants. Like New York's Zagat Survey (which no longer has a London edition), the ratings and reviews are based on the results of a reader survey (and were at one point also based on the personal visits of brothers and founders Richard and Peter Harden).

The survey on which the guide is based is also used to produce The Sunday Times Food List – an annual publication featuring the top 100 restaurants in the UK.

It is published annually, and in addition to evaluating individual restaurants, and "Best of", it provides analysis of the restaurant scene and developments over the past year.

History 
The London guide was first published in 1991, and based on experiences with restaurant guides in New York City and Düsseldorf.

In 1998, the UK guide was started.

References

External links 
 Harden's homepage

Publications established in 1991
Restaurant guides
Travel guide books